A jitterbug is a swing dancer, any of various types of swing dances, or the act of dancing to swing music.

Jitterbug may also refer to:

 "The Jitterbug", a song cut from the Wizard of Oz soundtrack
 Jitterbugs, a film
 Jitterbug Perfume, a novel by Tom Robbins
 Jitterbug Wireless, a mobile phone company
 Diddley bow, a musical instrument
 "Jitterbug", a song by Ellegarden
 "Jitterbuggin'", a song by Heatwave from Candles
 "Jitterbug (Junior Is A)", a song by Cardiacs from Guns
 "JitterBug", a free software web based (software) bug tracking system
 "Wake Me Up Before You Go-Go", a song by Wham! which uses the spoken-word inserted throughout.
 Jitterbug transformation, a term coined by Buckminster Fuller for the chiral transformations of the cuboctahedron

See also
 Cajun Jitterbug, a style of dancing
 Jitterbug Stroll, a dance